

Events

October
 – Planned completion of the Penn Station Access project, designed to divert Metro-North Railroad trains to a new terminus at Penn Station in New York City.

Unknown date
 – Expected opening of Semmering Base Tunnel.
 – Calgary Green Line opening.
 – Estimated completion of the Metrolinx Ontario Line in Toronto.
 – Expected opening of Haifa–Nazareth railway.
 – quadriple-track upgrading of Gyeongbu HSR Line, claimed maximum speed increase to 400 km/h.
 – Chuncheon–Sokcho Line 250 km/h operation starts.
 – Estimated Suseo–Gwangju high-speed branch opening.
 – Donghae Line  250 km/h operation starts.
 – Honam Line 250 km/h operation starts.
 – Gyeonggang Line 250 km/h operation starts.
 – JR Central will start operating the Chūō Shinkansen Maglev between Shinagawa Station (Tokyo) and Nagoya Station (Nagoya).
 – Planned completion of the Yangon Urban Mass Rapid Transit system.
 – Stage 1 of the Jurong Region MRT line is expected to open.
 – Lausanne Metro Line M2 New Lausanne-Gare extension.
 – Lausanne Metro Line M3 opening.
 – Estimated opening of the Chiang Mai light rail transit system.
 – Bangkok Purple Line Southern Extension opening.
 – Los Angeles Metro C Line extension to Torrance is planned to be completed under an accelerated schedule.
 – Earliest estimated opening of the New York City Subway Second Avenue Subway Phase 2.
 – The Atlanta Streetcar is planned to be extended to Ponce City Market along the BeltLine.
 – Estimated completion of VTA light rail extension to Eastridge Transit Center in San Jose.
 – Expected opening of the Southwest LRT extension of the Minneapolis Metro light rail system.

References